Aleksandra Trojan (born ) is a Polish volleyball player. She is part of the Poland women's national volleyball team.

She participated in the 2015 FIVB Volleyball World Grand Prix.
On club level she played for BKS SA in 2015.

References

External links
http://www.cev.lu/competition-area/PlayerDetails.aspx?TeamID=8401&PlayerID=13663&ID=679

1991 births
Living people
Polish women's volleyball players
People from Myślenice County